The 2004 U.S. Women's Open was the 59th U.S. Women's Open, held July 1–4 at the Orchards Golf Club in South Hadley, Massachusetts, a suburb north of Springfield. The event was televised by ESPN and NBC Sports.

Meg Mallon won her second U.S. Women's Open title, two strokes ahead of runner-up Annika Sörenstam. The 54-hole leader was Jennifer Rosales at 206 (−7), with Mallon, Sörenstam, and Kelly Robbins three strokes back at 209 (−4).

In the final round, Mallon shot 65 (−6) to Sorenstam's 67 (−4), and Rosales fell down to fourth with a 75 (+4). It was Mallon's fourth and final major title; her first was thirteen years earlier in 1991, also at the U.S. Open.

Course layout
The Orchards Golf Club

Source:

Past champions in the field

Made the cut

Missed the cut

Round summaries

First round
Thursday, July 1, 2004
Friday, July 2, 2004

Source:

Second round
Friday, July 2, 2004

Source:

Third round
Saturday, July 3, 2004

Source:

Final round
Sunday, July 4, 2004

Source:

Scorecard
Final round

Cumulative tournament scores, relative to par

Source:

References

External links

Golf Observer final leaderboard
U.S. Women's Open Golf Championship
The Orchards Golf Club
U.S. Women's Open – past champions – 2004

U.S. Women's Open
U.S. Women's Open
U.S. Women's Open
Golf in Massachusetts
History of Hampshire County, Massachusetts
U.S. Women's Open
South Hadley, Massachusetts
Sports competitions in Massachusetts
Tourist attractions in Hampshire County, Massachusetts
U.S. Women's Open
Women's sports in Massachusetts